"I Can't Dance to That Music You're Playin'" is a 1968 funk-soul single by Motown girl group Martha and the Vandellas (credited as Martha Reeves & the Vandellas).

Background
It's notable for featuring background vocals by The Andantes (who had been in a succession of Vandellas singles since "My Baby Loves Me") and Syreeta Wright, who had recently signed to the Motown label and was dating Motown artist Stevie Wonder, at the time. The song talked about how one woman's musician boyfriend leaving her with questions about how he was running off without giving the woman a hint of what he was exactly doing.  Reeves would later say that the reason why the chorus was sung by Wright and not by Reeves was because she and the Vandellas had a touring schedule  that did not allowed her to re-record the chorus, which had been changed with different music. The original recording circulates among collectors, but Reeves can be heard singing the new chorus with Wright and the Andantes in the end of the song, on the mix that was finally released.

Credits
Lead vocals by Martha Reeves
Additional lead vocals by Syreeta Wright (on the chorus)
Background vocals by The Andantes: Marlene Barrow, Jackie Hicks and Louvain Demps
Written by Deke Richards & Debbie Dean
Produced by Deke Richards

Chart performance
The song nearly returned the group to the top 40 on the Billboard singles chart peaking at number 42 and reaching number 24 on the R&B singles chart.

Cover versions
"I Can't Dance to That Music You're Playin" was covered in a version by Tina Charles in 1976 which failed to make the charts, and another version was later recorded by the Beatmasters with Betty Boo and reached number 7 in the UK charts in 1989.

References

1968 songs
1969 singles
Martha and the Vandellas songs
Songs written by Deke Richards
Motown singles
Songs about dancing